Peter Zaremba may refer to:
 Peter Zaremba (musician), lead singer of The Fleshtones
 Peter Zaremba (athlete) (1908–1994), American Olympic athlete